Engerdal is a municipality in Innlandet county, Norway. It is located in the traditional district of Østerdalen. The administrative centre of the municipality is the village of Engerdal. Other villages in the municipality include Drevsjø, Elgå, Sømådal, and Sorken.

The  municipality is the 28th largest by area out of the 356 municipalities in Norway. Engerdal is the 316th most populous municipality in Norway with a population of 1,253.

General information

The new municipality of Engerdal was established on 1 January 1911. This new municipality was created by taking some of the land from the following existing municipalities:
 of southeastern Tolga municipality (population: 201)
 of eastern Ytre Rendal municipality (population: 311)
 of eastern Øvre Rendal municipality (population: 381)
 of northern Trysil municipality (population: 291)
The borders of the municipality have not changed since its creation.

Name
The municipality was named , after a local valley. The first element of the name comes from the local river  which flows through the valley. The river name is derived from the name of the lake Engeren, and this is probably derived from the Old Norse word  which means "narrow".

Coat of arms
The coat of arms was granted on 8 February 1991. The arms show two pieces of a horse harness (the hames) in gold on a green background. The two objects symbolize the ties between horse and man and at the same time the connection between work and recreation.

Churches
The Church of Norway has five parishes within the municipality of Engerdal. It is part of the Sør-Østerdal prosti (deanery) in the Diocese of Hamar.

Geography
The municipality is located in the northeast part of Innlandet county. It is bordered by Sweden to the north and east, the municipality of Trysil to the south, Rendalen to the west, and Os and Tolga to the northwest. The greater part of Lake Femunden and roughly half of the Femundsmarka National Park also lie within the boundaries of the municipality. There are many large lakes in the municipality including Engeren, Galtsjøen, Gutulisjøen, Isteren, Langsjøen, Nedre Roasten, Rogen, and Vurrusjøen.

National parks
Engerdal consists of two national parks. Femundsmarka National Park was founded in 1971 and is situated in the far northeastern corner of the municipality. The area is popular for its many lakes and attracts a lot of people for sport fishing every year. The same lakes are also perfect for paddling the canoe. Due to its large continuously, untouched and protected area, the national park is one of southern Scandinavia's largest parks and the area has become a base for many rare animal species.

The second national park, Gutulia National Park is much smaller, but has a more vigorous complex of trees and bogs. It was founded in 1968 and the many large, but old pines dominates the area.

Government
All municipalities in Norway, including Engerdal, are responsible for primary education (through 10th grade), outpatient health services, senior citizen services, unemployment and other social services, zoning, economic development, and municipal roads.  The municipality is governed by a municipal council of elected representatives, which in turn elects a mayor.  The municipality falls under the Østre Innlandet District Court and the Eidsivating Court of Appeal.

Municipal council
The municipal council  of Engerdal is made up of 15 representatives that are elected to four year terms.  The party breakdown of the council is as follows:

Economy
The most important industries in the municipality are agriculture and travel and tourism. The area of agricultural activity constitute , which includes about 60 operating units. Due to the harsh climate, the agricultural activity is mainly based around production of domestic animals, such as sheep and milk production. Another important activity is forestry. The total area of forestry make up , where  of this is productive land for logging. Of the forested land, about 40% consists of spruce and 60% of pine. The main owner of the land is the Norwegian state, while the rest is divided between private land owners and some belongs to the company Engerdal kommuneskoger (KF), a subsidiary company owned by the municipality.

Tourism

Due to growth in building secondary residences in the municipality, recreation and leisure activities has become important for those visiting Engerdal and this have had a positive effect on the municipality's travel and tourism industry. Tourists visiting Engerdal will experience a great wilderness with outdoor activities and adventures. Today, a great complex of attractions, activities and museums will reflect the municipals long history and many of them have become important businesses for economic growth, also keeping the cultural heritage intact.

Museums
Blokkodden Villmarksmuseum is an outdoor museum situated along highway 26 in Drevsjø. Its aim is to document the historical exploitation of the wilderness and natural resources in the municipal. You will experience the cultural heritage dated all the way back from the 1700th century and you will get an impression of how people lived and worked here in the past.

Engerdal is the only municipality in Innlandet county with a full-time working Sami community, and it marks the current southernmost border of the traditional Sami region, Sápmi, within Norway. The museum, therefore, exhibits artifacts and buildings from this culture. The museum is open everyday from 1 July to 12 August. Guided tours are available and people can participate in special local arrangements, such as learning about "Falkefangst". About 300–400 years ago, this was a way of hunting Falcons in the mountains.

Attractions
In 1886 the steamship company Fæmund was established, and they invested in a wooden steamship, which today holds the same name: M/S Femund II. From then and still going today, the steamship cargos important goods for the locals and has become an important transportation for tourists wanting to visit the national parks along the lake.

Notable people 
 Egil Hylleraas (1898 in Engerdal – 1965), distinguished Norwegian theoretical physicist
 Gjermund Eggen (1941 in Engerdal – 2019), Norwegian cross-country skier who won three gold medals at the FIS Nordic World Ski Championships 1966
 Reidar Åsgård (born 1943), Norwegian politician and mayor of Engerdal
 Ola D. Gløtvold (born 1949 in Engerdal), Norwegian politician and mayor of Engerdal

See also
Scandinavian Mountains Airport

References

External links

Municipal fact sheet from Statistics Norway 
Femundsmarka National Park information

 
Municipalities of Hedmark
1911 establishments in Norway